Uganda, is now ranked number three in Africa as far as music and entertainment is concerned. Uganda is home to over 65 different ethnic groups and tribes, and they form the basis of all indigenous music. The Baganda, being the most musically vibrant nationality in the country, has defined what constitutes culture and music of Uganda over the last two centuries.

The first form of popular music to arise out of traditional music was the Kadongo Kamu style of music, which arose out of traditional Kiganda music. From the 80s till early 90s, Kadongo Kamu was influenced by musicians such as Peterson Mutebi, Dan Mugula, Sebadduka Toffa, Fred Ssonko, Livingstone Kasozi, Fred Masagazi, Baligidde, Abuman Mukungu, Gerald Mukasa, Sauda Nakakaawa, Matia Luyima, Herman Basudde, and Paulo Kafeero music genres drew from Kadongo Kamu, making it the most influential style of music in Uganda. In the late 80s, the late Philly Lutaaya released his "Born In Africa' album that would later dominate the air waves. Lutaaya also released his "Merry Christmas" that consisted of 8 songs. This album is still popular to date, all Philly Lutaaya's songs are now anthems amongst Ugandan music lovers.

In the early 1990s, a new music genre afro ragga locally called Kidandali formed by Rasta Rob, Kid Fox, Ras Khan, Messe, Shanks Vivid, Menton Summer, Ragga Dee, Bebe Cool and Jose Chameleone Bobi Wine and Steve Jean - who would later produce their songs. In 1997, Emperor Orlandoh and Menton Summer were the darlings after their "Sirikawo Baby" song becoming a national hit.

In the year 1998, Red Banton rose to fame with his "Noonya Money" album. He became the first Ugandan artist to travel to UK on an Artist Visa.

Because of the effects of globalization, Uganda, like most African countries, has seen a growth in modern audio production. This has led to the adoption of western music styles like Dancehall and Hip Hop.

Uganda's most travelled and popular DJ, Erycom, real names Mutebi Erycom, was the first Ugandan to own a Youtube channel and he's among the first two Ugandans to make Ugandan music circulate online digitally.

DJ Erycom has used the availability of internet to promote Ugandan music and Ugandan artists, hence the reason as to why Ugandan music has reached every corner of this digital world.

A number of performing artists have joined the Uganda Performing Rights Society which has further more improved Uganda artists music and benefits through its roles as copyright administrators.

Traditional Music from different Regions of Uganda 
Uganda is divided into 4 regions namely; Central, Northern, Eastern and  Western. Each region has distinct traditional music as per the tribes and ethnicities.

Uganda's nationalities are diverse and spread evenly throughout the country. Native music in Uganda, like in most African regions, is mainly functional. This means that most music and music activities usually have specific functions related to specific festivities like marriage, initiation, royal festivals, harvests and war among others. The music is performed by skilled tribesmen and women who are good at playing various traditional instruments, folk songs and traditional dances.

Central 

The Baganda are found in Buganda in the central region; they are the largest native nationality in the country. The kingdom is ruled by a king, known as a Kabaka. The kabaka has traditionally been the main patron of the music of Buganda. Musical instruments include various forms of drums, making percussion an integral part of the music).

The massive and sacred royal drums are just one of the many drum types. The engalabi is another common drum and it is a long round shaped drum. The drums are used in unison with various other melodic musical instruments ranging from chordophones like the ennanga harp and the entongoli lyre, lamellophones, aerophones, and idiophones and the locally made fiddle called kadingidi.

Music is played for dancing in the community, Call and response style of singing is common with the Bantu from the 19th century. The Baganda have a variety of vibrant dances that go along with the elaborate instrumentation. The bakisimba dance is the most common and most performed. There are others like nankasa and the amaggunju. The amaggunju is an exclusive dance developed in the palace for the Kabaka.

Northern Uganda in particularly Acholi had a powerful Vocalist name Ojara Eddy in the late 80's

Eastern  
To differentiate Eastern region from other regions. This region has several tribes namely Bagwere,basoga,banyoli,bagisu,jopadhola,iteso,sabin,basamya and each tribe has its kind of music. In the 90s these tribes used to produce music using their own made instruments like the Bagwere had an instrument called kongo ,basoga had xylophones (mbeire),Jopadhola and banyoli had fumbo,iteso had adungu so during that time their music was different in production and composition according to which tribe was singing. In the 20th century, many tribes have tried to adopt to modern production and still they make their songs in their native languages according to their tribes . There are many artist from several tribes like bagwere have waisana,benenego, rapper sky dee,area b, waikere ,bluzman etc, Bagisu  have san sea,ben,nutty neithan etc, Basoga have crazy mc,racheal magola,maro etc. Most of these tribes have kings that have helped in the promotion of culture and music at large , the Bagwere king is called ikumbania,the Bagisu king is called omukuka,the Basoga king is called chabazinga,the iteso king is called emorimori. Lastly eastern region  has several district.

Western 
Talents have developed from ages of Sister Charity, Chance Kahindo and Rasta Charz to the years of Ray G, Jolow, Allan Toniks, Seyo, T Bro, Emily Kikazi, Muzz Joe, T Paul, Rachael T, Mat Henry, CJ Champion to Penny Patra, Amani Amaniga, Carol Kay, Prettie Immaq and more of the new guys on block.
After the success of a one "Omusheshe" song of Ray G & Spice Diana, Runyankole was embraced in major parts of Uganda. Central artists too teaming up with western Uganda's artists on songs like "True man hood" Allstars ft T Bro, "Tikikushemerire" of Gen Geeon ft Jose Chameleon, "Yeele" Geosteady ft Ray G, "Ninkukunda" Ray G ft Voltage music, "Mbarara boy" Mc Kacheche ft John Blaq, "Elevate" Rachael T ft Colifixe, "Sagala" T Paul ft Cosign. These too have boosted the industry to the national level.

The growth of deejaying industry that saw the coming in of DJs Alberto 43, Dj Mats, DJ Sky, Riddim Selecta, Starcent Dj, Jahlive, DJ Emma, DJ Bristol and deejays labels like XL Deejayz Street Deejays, Massive effect Deejays, 43 Effect Deejays among a few.

Music promoters' impact.  From Online and Offline, including Feezah music uganda  Alpha Promotions, Bantu Hits, Uganda Djs Online Radio Karen Promotions, D3 Promotions, Lala Promotions, Patra Promotions, JKG Promotions, MOK Alozius Promotions, individuals like Dely Derick, Mc Katala, Mr vybs live among many. 
Radio and Television are supporting talent too. The development of radio from the regions first radio "Voice of Tooro" to Radio West, Messiah Radio in Kasese, Voice of Kigezi to Endigyito, Voice of Kamwenge, Kasese Guide Radio, Rwenzori FM, BFM, Hits FM, and urban radios like Crooze FM, Boona FM, K Town Radio, Ngabu FM and Street Deejays Radio (Online Radio) has seen western Uganda's music grow fast.
Television development has been slow thou the coming of TV West, and Bunyoro TV has also developed western Ugandas music.The two TVs have given platforms to the artists through playing their videos on visuals and bringing them to the public eye.
Through radios and TVs, we saw the coming of Mc Kacheche, Kunana MC, Lithan MC, Mr Jay among others. Kacheche's coming is one of the reasons Western Uganda's music has been embraced in the central. 
The growth in music events, especially in bars of Mbarara, Rukungiri, Kabale, Fort Portal, Ishaka, Kasese and Kamwenge gives platforms to the starting artists to be heard of.

Popular music 
Because of Uganda's turbulent political history, there was never enough time for there to be a thriving pop music industry until relative peace was restored in the late 1980s. By then, musicians like Philly Lutaaya, Afrigo Band, and Elly Wamala were the few Ugandan acts to have had mainstream music success. Jimmy Katumba and his music group the Ebonies were also popular at this time, especially towards the 1990s.

Musicians like, Carol Nakimera, Kezia Nambi, Fred Maiso, Kads Band, Rasta Rob, Menton Summer were on top of the Ugandan music game between 1990 and 1997. Artists like, Livingstone Kasozi, Herman Basudde and Paulo Kafeero also played a great role in bringing live music near to the fans.

According to popular music promoter and legendary DJ Erycom, In the year 1998, Uganda experienced the biggest change musically. Thanks to musician Red Banton (the Five star general) who rose to fame with his Noonya Money hit song that played country wide. Red Banton ruled the Ugandan music scene until the year 2000 when Jose Chameleone returned from Kenya with his "Mama Mia" song that turned into a National anthem in Uganda and East Africa at large.

The 1990s saw Uganda's love affair with Jamaican music begin when artists like Shanks Vivi Dee, Ragga Dee, and others were influenced by Jamaican superstars like Shabba Ranks. They imported the Ragga music culture into Uganda and, although they faced stiff competition from other African music styles and musicians at the time, in particular Soukous from Congo and Kwaito from South Africa, they formed the foundation of the pop music industry. But it was not until the 21st century when musicians like Chameleone emerged that a pop music scene really began.

By around 2007, there were a number of musicians practicing varied styles of music, and the role of western and Congolese/South African music had greatly diminished. Today, musicians like Iryn Namubiru and King Saha are just a few of the many pop musicians in a thriving and vibrant pop music scene. The pop music duo of Radio & Weasel, the Goodlyfe Crew, is well known around Africa, being nominated in the continental MTV Base awards in 2010 and BET awards in 2013. In June 2015, Eddy Kenzo won the award for "Best new international artist" at the 2015 BET music awards.

Kadongo Kamu 

The word "Kadongo Kamu" is a term in the Luganda language that means "one guitar". The music is given this name because of the role played by the bass guitar, which most times is the solo instrument used in creation of the music. Perhaps the first well known artist of the genre was Fred Masagazi in the 1960s.

The late Elly Wamala contributed a lot in making urban Kadongo Kamu style. Christopher Sebadduka popularised the genre and perhaps this is why he is considered by many to be  the God father of kadongo kamu. Elly Wamala abandoned this genre because it was also instrumented by non elite like Christopher Sebadduka. His brand of educative singing won him many fans and he is one of the few musicians who was involved with Uganda's independence in 1962. . They were followed by a number of musicians who kept true to the style and sound of the music.

Herman Basudde was a very popular kadongo kamu musician in the 1980s and 1990s. So was Bernard Kabanda. Dan Mugula is one of the few surviving pioneers of the genre. Fred Sebatta and Paulo Kafeero made their mark in the 1990s. Today, the genre is marginalized in favor of more recent styles of music. But because the music is loved by cultural loyalists in the buganda region, it is certain that there will always be an audience for kadongo kamu.

Uganda's Top 50 Songs Since 1990 

Uganda has had many artists who have been on top of their game with either one or two big songs. According to DJ Erycom, one of Uganda's popular veteran DJs and digital music promoter of this generation, below are the biggest Ugandan songs that crossed borders and topped charts. These songs still sound fresh whenever you listen to them:

-Born In Africa By Philly Lutaaya
-Land of Anaka By Geoffrey Oryema
-Bus Dunia By Herman Basudde
-Sirikawo Baby By Menton Summer & Emperor Orlando
-Wipolo By Pastor George Okudi
-Noonya Money By Red Banton
-Mama Mia By Jose Chameleone
-Mbawe By Ragga Dee
–Tindatine By Lady Mariam
-Kapapaala By David Lutalo
-Bamidomo Midomo By Da Twinz
-Mu Ggulu Teriyo Mwenge By Menton Kronno & Gen Mega Dee
-Mic Ya Ziggy Dee
-Badda By Bobi Wine
-Jamila By Jose Chameleone
-Ani Akumanyi By Grace & Gatimo
-Swimming Pool By Abdu Mulaasi
-Angela By Sizza Man
-Dippo Nazigala By Paulo Kafeero
-Nakudata By Radio & Weasel
-Ekinaigeria By Harriet Kisaakye
-Siggwe Ansimira By Mesach Semakula
-Mwana Muwala Nga Walaba By Mega Dee
-Stamina By Eddy Kenzo
-Wendi By Bobi Wine
-Kasepiki By Bebe Cool
-Nabikoowa By Juliana Kanyomozi
-Mbakwekule By Sheebah
-Ndigida By Ragga Dee
-Champion By AK47
-Maria Roza By Eddy Kenzo
-Ginkeese By Qute Kaye
-Oli Wange By Rema
-Tuli Kubunkenke By Ronald Mayinja
-Mazongoto By Dr Hilderman
-Bread & Butter By Radio & Weasel
-Jangu By Obsessions
-Nakatudde By Madox Semanda Ssematimba
-Maama Brenda By Sweet Kid
-Neera Neera By Mowzey Radio
-Omusono Gwa Mungu Abdu Mulaasi
-Obangaina By Racheal Magoola
-Juicy By Radio & Weasel
-Manzi Wa Nani By Clever J
-Sikulimba By Afrigo Band
-Nkumira Omukwano By Aziz Azion
-Omusheshe By Chance Nalubega
-Bbaala By Daxx Kartel
-Ekimbeewo By Halimah Namakula
-Basiima Ogenze By Jose Chameleone
-Ddole Yomwana By Fred Sebatta
-Sweet Wange By Phoebe Nassolo
-Kyarenga By Bobi Wine
-Beera Nange By Judith Babirye
-Kani By Pastor Wilson Bugembe
-Amasso By Pallaso, Radio & Weasel
-Walumbe Remix By Gravity Omutujju
-Muliranwa By King Saha
-Sitya Loss By Eddy Kenzo
-Ngenda Kusiba Farm By Abdu Mulaasi
-Badilisha By Jose Chameleone
-Bogolako By Bebe Cool
-Maama Mbire By Bobi Wine & Juliana
-Mbiro Mbiro By Eddy Kenzo

Kidandali 

Kidandali is a music genre that currently is arguably the most popular genre of music in Uganda. However, the term "kidandali" is not universally agreed on as the name of this genre with some local sources preferring instead to use the very simplistic term "Band Music" while others prefer the term Afrobeat, even though the music shares no similarities with Afrobeat. The roots of this genre can be traced back to the bands that sprung up after Uganda got independence in 1962.

The Cranes Band, which later gave birth to Afrigo Band, can be regarded as the first group in the evolution process of this genre. At the very outset, their music was heavily influenced by Soukous and congolese artists like Franco were notable influences at the time. Jazz was also a notable influence. Along the way there were other bands like Rwenzori Band, Big Five Band and Simba Ngoma Band. But Afrigo Band was the most prominent and most enduring, especially throughout the political unrest of the 1970s to 1990s.

By the mid 1990s Afrigo Band was still heavily influenced by Soukous music, which by then was dominant all over the African continent. Artists like Joanita Kawalya and Rachael Magoola were part of Afrigo Band and helped lay the foundation for modern day Kidandali, alongside other bands like Kaads Band. The turning point, however, came with the formation of the record label Eagles Production which was responsible for producing artists like Mesach Semakula, Geoffrey Lutaaya, Ronald Mayinja and Haruna Mubiru. These artists took the mantle from Afrigo Band and further developed the genre after the turn of the century.

In the 2000s, the genre became identified with the Eagles Production label. The label continued to produce more talent, especially female artists like Ronald Mayinja, Geoffrey Lutaaya, Mesach Semakula, Roy Kapale, Mariam Ndagire, Phionah Mukasa, Mariam Mulinde, Queen Florence, The late Harriet Kisaakye Cathy Kusasira, Irene Namatovu and Stecia Mayanja. Another turning point was in 2008 when David Lutalo broke through with the hit song Kapapaala creating the way for the Urban Band genre to move beyond a genre that had for long been dominated by Eagles Production, Diamond Production, Kads Band, Backeys Band, Kats Production, The Hommies among others.

In the year 2003, Uganda witnessed the birth of a new kind on the block, Abdu Mulaasi. With his mega country wide hit "Omusono Gwa Mungu", Abdu Mulaasi became a house hold name creating himself a place amongst the top artists in the country. Abdu Mulaasi went to release hits like: Swimming Pool, Njagal Ebbere, Ekyaapa, Obuffumbo Bwa Liizi, Ngenda Kusiba Farm and Omuchaina. Enkulu Tenywa was another big song that kept Abdu Mulaasi on top of his game. By the end of the year 2010, Abdu Mulaasi had changed the sound of KadongoKamu hence introducing Urban Kadongo Kamu.

DJ Erycom, one of Uganda's legendary Deejays was the first deejay to play, promote and popularize Kadongokamu music across bars and happening places in and outside Uganda.

About the same time, technology in audio production had enabled the genre to be reproduced digitally using Audio Workstations and the "band" element had all but disappeared. Recording studios like Kann, Dream Studios, Mozart and Paddyman took center stage. Many other independent solo artists started to practice the genre. Artists like Dr Tee, Martin Angume and even Chameleone achieved success with this genre. The genre is currently at the peak of its evolution with newer artists like Papa Cidy and Chris Evans helping create a dominant force that, alongside Dancehall, is the most popular stylistic genre in Uganda.

Dancehall 
Dancehall music in Uganda is modeled after Jamaican Dancehall. It is among the most influential styles of music in the Ugandan pop music industry. The style of music is very similar to the Jamaican style and so like all imported genres, the only major difference is in language used. Although most dancehall artists will perform in their local language, in this case Luganda, many of them will every now and then try to mimic Jamaican patois. During the early to mid 1990s when Uganda's pop industry was just beginning to be formed, the first international music to make an impression on Ugandan artists was the Raggamuffin music in Jamaica at the time. 
Artists like Shabba Ranks and Buju Banton became the inspiration for Ugandan artists like Shanks Vivi D, Ragga Dee, Menton Krono and Rasta Rob. The predominant beat that was used by these artists was the Dem Bow beat which was created by Shabba Ranks. This beat became the foundation on which all of Ugandan dancehall was to be built on later, just like it did with Reggaeton. In the late 1990s new artists like Mega Dee and Emperor Orlando joined the fray.

By the turn of the century, dancehall, or ragga as it was/is commonly called, was already the most popular music genre. New artists like Chameleone, Bebe Cool and Bobi Wine joined the scene and consolidated it. But they didn't create any marked improvement in the quality and sound of the music they found, as it remained pretty simplistic and heavily based on Dem Bow. From then on, the quality of music became commensurate with the quality of production available. Chameleone was the first dancehall artist to try to fuse this ragga sound with other genres like Soukous and Kadongo Kamu. By around 2006, there were a variety of musicians practicing the genre but also without much advancement in style or sound.

By this time, Jamaican dancehall had already taken a sharp turn away from the harsh "ragga" sound based on chatting over simplistic riddims and there was a new wave of dancehall deejays like Vybz Kartel and Busy Signal who were deejaying over more advanced riddims. Artists like Dr Hilderman came into the scene with new words like Double bed Mazongoto and have continued to grow.  It is not until very recently that we have begun to also see new Ugandan artists like Rabadaba, Sizza and Fidempa create a more modern version of dancehall. Ugandan dancehall artists have reaped big from the industry, many are industrious and live luxurious lives.

Hip Hop/R&B 
Hip Hop music in Uganda is modeled after American Hip Hop. There is really not much difference stylistically between Ugandan hip hop and the American version. Because of the digital revolution, there is access to modern production technologies in Uganda hence the "beats" that current local producers are creating are high quality and not far behind the American ones. The fundamental difference between the two genres is that in Uganda, as in most African countries, most artists will rap in their local language. In Uganda's case, the language is Luganda. This has created the synonym "Lugaflow" to further define Ugandan rap music.

Hip hop is one of the newer genres to be widely practiced in Uganda. The two music groups, l Klear Kut and Bataka Squad were the first musical acts to do hip hop back in the late 1990s. Mainstream acceptance for the music genre was almost non existent by then. However, a number of the members of the aforementioned groups persisted with the genre, especially Navio (rapper) and Babaluku. Others like Sylvester & Abramz also kept creating rap music, focusing on socially conscious themes and topics.

Around the middle of the previous decade, more acts started joining the fray, with Rocky Giant being one of the first rappers to be embraced in the mainstream. But it was not until GNL broke through circa 2008 that the genre really gained steam. GNL made hip hop more acceptable and accessible and many "lugaflow" rappers began to emerge. Since then there has been a flurry of activity on the scene with a sizable number of rappers enjoying relative success in the music industry and on the radio circuit. Musicians like Jay-P and keko are among a new breed of Ugandan hip hop acts appealing to a broader audience, with their music featuring on international platforms like MTV.

As with Hip Hop, R&B in Uganda is modeled after American R&B. There is not much history in Ugandan R&B, with Steve Jean being the first artist to practice the genre around the turn of the century. But it was Michael Ross who really begun the trend circa 2002 with songs like How Do You Love and Sinorita. It was not until circa 2008 that a number of musicians started to embrace the style, with Myco Chris and Baby Joe among those in Diaspora that must be credited. Blu 3 and Aziz Azion are notable practitioners. Recently, artists like Nick Nola, Richy, Pallaso, Woodz and Yoyo have spread the appeal of the genre further.

Gospel 
Early Gospel music in Uganda was modeled mainly after praise and worship music practiced by church choirs and bands. This was particularly true for the pentecostal/Born Again movement, locally referred to as Balokole.

Artists like Fiona Mukasa in the mid-1990s were responsible for taking praise and worship music out of the churches and onto the streets. Because of the influence of Soukous music at the time, this early gospel had a Soukous sound. Limit X were another gospel group that gained popularity during the 1990s, although the group had formed years earlier, in the late 1970s.

Just after the turn of the century, the styles in gospel became more diverse, with various groups like Sauti, and First Love adding to the urban sound created by Limit X. Others like George Okudi and Father Musaala had hits on the radio circuit and internationally.

Gospel, however, started having a notable impact on the music industry when Judith Babirye broke through circa 2007. Babirye, whose music was similar to Mukasa's, was an instant hit and her song "Beera Nange" was among the songs of the year in its year of release.

She was followed by Wilson Bugembe, another musician who was readily embraced by the listening public with his songs becoming national hits, cutting across all demographics.

They have since been joined by various new artists like Levixone whose song "mbeera" turned into a hit song in year 2021 and others who are spanning various genres.

Classical 
There are a few music schools in a conservatoire model in Uganda, most of them in the capital Kampala. The music schools in Kampala include Kampala Music School, MusiConnexions Uganda and Esom Music School. "Even though they are not very well equipped as a result of small budgets, they offer appropriate music training to many people. To date more young people and adults alike appreciate classical music better and as such they engage in taking private music lessons, attending classical music concerts and several take part in actual performances. There are a few Western music education stems way back to missionary times. Before the missionaries arrived in Uganda does not mean that music education was not in existence, but rather that it was different from what was introduced by missionaries.  Classical music in Uganda is developing and growing little by little.

Music industry 
Uganda has a vibrant music industry that plays a fundamental role in the social and economic lives of many. Musicians are the main celebrities in Uganda, and all entertainment content from the mainstream media will most times be about music or musicians. The private lives of musicians are closely followed by many Ugandans. Music concerts, most times called album launches, are very popular. Many companies spend huge amounts of money on sponsoring these music concerts, and advertisements for the concerts are very common on radio and television.

The emphasis on music concerts comes from the fact that very few music artists make a worthwhile income from sales of their music on physical media. The lack of any distribution structure means that there is little to no incentive for capital investment in artist development or music sales. There are no genuine record labels, with most of the companies that are referred to as labels being merely artist management companies. Because of these inadequacies, there is a severe strain placed upon musicians to find profitability and sustainability in making music.

There have also been efforts at organizing the music industry, with the Uganda Performing Rights Society (UPRS), Bryan Morel Publications and Uganda Musicians Association being prime examples alongside a number of music awards organizations like AFRIMA Awards, PAM Awards and more recently HiPipo Music Awards. Attempts by some of these organizations to make use of an under-utilized and largely ignored copyright law to generate revenue from music distribution have proved fruitless. These are some of the challenges facing the music industry in the country and indeed are very similar to the ones facing most music industries around the world.

Promotion of Ugandan Music 
According to Jones, A.M (1954), traditional music has remained popular with rural communities and Uganda has a plethora of distinctive instruments, which can also be heard in contemporary popular music. The most notable record labels like Black Market Records and international organisations such as Singing Wells and Selam from the UK have been working to promote regional and traditional music in Uganda.  Currently, the above organisations have been specialising in field-recording in rural areas. Their initial projects were aimed at helping the localisation of hip-hop, though they have recently been facilitating capacity building work (audio production, copyright knowledge) through the support of Swedish International Development Cooperation Agency (SIDA). Some UK labels have picked up on obscure but cool local music scenes and some of Uganda's music could fill this niche and find a route to international markets. These styles could include Larakaraka music from Gulu or Bukusu Music from the North East Mbale region. Alongside Kandongo Kamu, another native popular music is Kidandali. In their contemporary forms they are both fused with reggae and ragga.

Ugandan pop musicians have used radio and television to promote their music. Others have held concerts and others performing their music at events like weddings and other kinds of parties. With the coming of the internet, they used social media to promote their music. These avenues also helped then earn money. However, most Ugandan musicians haven't yet embraced digital distribution of their music. The Covid-19 pandemic reached in Uganda and affected the way of music promotion and distribution and saw musicians embracing the use of the internet to promote and distribute their music. Musicians like Desire Luzinda, Navio, Iryn Namubiru, Bobi Wine, Gabriel K, Jose Chameleone and promotion managements like Bryan Morel Publications, Promoter Musa, Ivan Jay Music  of  Ivan Jay Music Promoter and Fezah changed the way of holding concerts and instead of having revelers physically at the venue, they held online concerts and their fans streamed their performances live and others broadcast them on television afterwards.

See also 
Baganda music
Bigwala
Kadongo Kamu
Kidandali
Ray G

References

External links 
Feezah Music Uganda - Buy, Download & Listen to Ugandan music worldwide.
List of Top Ugandan Songs. - Official Ugandan Music Website
Download Ugandan Music – ERYCOM
Full List Of Top Ugandan Artists
Most Recently Added Ugandan Music
BBC: Information about Buganda royal court music.
Howwe
HiPipo
Music Uganda
Uganda Publishing Rights Society
Field recordings made in Uganda by ethnomusicologist, Peter Cooke
Field recordings made in Uganda by ethnomusicologist, Klaus Wachsmann
Field recordings made in by ethnomusicologist, Kenneth Gourlay